Timothy Overton (born 6 May 1944) is a South African former cricketer. He played in four first-class matches for Border in 1966/67.

See also
 List of Border representative cricketers

References

External links
 

1944 births
Living people
South African cricketers
Border cricketers
People from Stellenbosch
Cricketers from the Western Cape